Thomas Enqvist won in the final 6–2, 7–6(7–3) against Byron Black.

Seeds

  Thomas Enqvist (champion)
  Wayne Ferreira (second round)
  Byron Black (final)
  Jakob Hlasek (second round)
  Tim Henman (first round)
  Jonas Björkman (first round)
  Johan van Herck (second round)
  Jérôme Golmard (quarterfinals)

Draw

Finals

Top half

Bottom half

References
 1996 India Open draw

1996 India Open
Maharashtra Open